Saturday Night may refer to:

Film, television and theatre

Film
 Saturday Night (1922 film), a 1922 film directed by Cecil B. DeMille
 Saturday Nights (film), a 1933 Swedish film directed by Schamyl Bauman
 Saturday Night (1950 film), a Spanish film directed by Rafael Gil
 Saturday Night (1957 film), a Yugoslav film directed by Vladimir Pogačić
 Saturday Night, a 1975 short film based on Sondheim's musical and directed by James Benning
 Saturday Night (2000 film), an Australian film starring Alison Whyte
 Saturday Night (2010 film), an American documentary film about the television series Saturday Night Live
 Saturday Night (2022 film), a Malayalam-language comedy-drama

Television
 Saturday Night Live, an American sketch-comedy show originally called NBC's Saturday Night
 Saturday Night (BBC comedy series), 1972, starring James Young
 Saturday Night Rove, an Australian variety series hosted by Rove McManus
 Saturday Night, a pre-game program that precedes Hockey Night in Canada
 WCW Saturday Night, an American wrestling program

Theatre
 Saturday Night (musical), by Stephen Sondheim, 1955

Literature
 Saturday Night (book), by Susan Orlean, 1990
 Saturday Night (magazine), a Canadian magazine
 Saturday Night Magazine (U.S.), a lifestyle magazine
 Ireland's Saturday Night, an Irish sports newspaper

Music

Albums
 Saturday Night (The Bear Quartet album), 2005
 Saturday Night (Zhané album), 1997
 Saturday Night! – The Album, by Schoolly D, 1986, and its title track
 Saturday Night, by Black Lace, 1995

Songs
 "Saturday Night" (Bay City Rollers song), 1975
 "Saturday Night" (The Blue Nile song), 1989
 "Saturday Night" (Cold Chisel song), 1984
 "Saturday Night" (Drowning Pool song), 2012
 "Saturday Night" (Jessica Mauboy song), 2010
 "Saturday Nights" (Khalid song), 2019
 "Saturday Night" (Natalia Kills song), 2013
 "Saturday Night" (Sandi Thom song), 2008
 "Saturday Night" (Sqeezer song), 1997
 "Saturday Night" (Suede song), 1997
 "Saturday Night" (The Underdog Project song), 2002
 "Saturday Night" (Whigfield song), 1994
 "Saturday Nite" (song), by Earth, Wind & Fire
 "Saturday Night (Is the Loneliest Night of the Week)", a 1944 song popularized by Frank Sinatra and later by Bobby Vinton
 "Say Amen (Saturday Night)", a 2018 song by Panic! at the Disco
 "Saturday Night", by Aaron Carter from the soundtrack for the 2005 film Popstar
 "Saturday Night", by The Commodores from the 1981 album In the Pocket
 "Saturday Night", by Crayon Pop, 2012
 "Saturday Night", by Daniel Lindström, 2008
 "Saturday Night", by The Eagles from the 1973 album Desperado
 "Saturday Night", by Lonestar from the 1999 album Lonely Grill
 "Saturday Night", by Herbie Hancock from the 1980 album Monster
 "Saturday Night", by Herman Brood & His Wild Romance from the 1978 album Shpritsz
 "Saturday Night", by Kaiser Chiefs from the 2005 album Employment
 "Saturday Night", by Misfits from the 1999 album Famous Monsters
 "Saturday Night", by The New Christy Minstrels, 1963
 "Saturday Night", by Noisettes from the 2009 album Wild Young Hearts
 "Saturday Night", by The Odds, the first signing of Red Rhino Records
 "Saturday Night", by Ozomatli from the 2004 album Street Signs
 "Saturday Night", by The Thrills from the 2005 album Let's Bottle Bohemia
 "Saturday Night", a song by U2 that became "Fire", 1981
 "Saturday Night", by 2 Chainz from the 2017 album Pretty Girls Like Trap Music

Other uses
 Motza'ei Shabbat, the time in the evening immediately following Shabbat, that is Saturday night

See also
 One More Saturday Night (disambiguation)
 Saturday (disambiguation)
 Saturday Night and Sunday Morning (disambiguation)
 Saturday Night Live (disambiguation)
 Saturday Knight, a South African rugby and cricket player
 Saturday Night Fever, a 1977 American film
 "It's Saturday Night", a song by The Proclaimers from Sunshine on Leith